Pseudonebularia is a genus of sea snails, marine gastropod mollusks in the subfamily Mitrinae of the family Mitridae.

Species
Species within the genus Pseudonebularia include:

 Pseudonebularia atjehensis (Oostingh, 1939)
 Pseudonebularia chrysalis (Reeve, 1844) 
 Pseudonebularia cingulata (Reeve, 1844)
 Pseudonebularia connectens (Dautzenberg & Bouge, 1923)
 Pseudonebularia cucumerina (Lamarck, 1811)
 Pseudonebularia damasomonteiroi (T. Cossignani & V. Cossignani, 2007)
 Pseudonebularia doliolum (Küster, 1839)
 Pseudonebularia dovpeledi (H. Turner, 1997)
 Pseudonebularia fraga (H. Turner, 1997) 
 Pseudonebularia gracilefragum (H. Turner, 2007)
 Pseudonebularia indentata (G. B. Sowerby II, 1874)
 Pseudonebularia kantori (Poppe, Tagaro & R. Salisbury, 2009)
 Pseudonebularia lienardi G. B. Sowerby II, 1874)
 Pseudonebularia maesta (Reeve, 1845)
 Pseudonebularia pediculus (Lamarck, 1811)
 Pseudonebularia perdulca (Poppe, Tagaro & R. Salisbury, 2009)
 Pseudonebularia proscissa (Reeve, 1844)
 Pseudonebularia rotundilirata (Reeve, 1844)
 Pseudonebularia rubiginea (A. Adams, 1855)
 Pseudonebularia rubritincta (Reeve, 1844)
 Pseudonebularia rueppellii (Reeve, 1844)
 Pseudonebularia rutila (A. Adams, 1853)
 Pseudonebularia sarinoae (Poppe, 2008)
 Pseudonebularia semiferruginea (Reeve, 1845)
 Pseudonebularia silviae (H. Turner, 2007)
 Pseudonebularia suturistrigata Marrow, 2020
 Pseudonebularia tabanula (Lamarck, 1811)
 Pseudonebularia tornata (Reeve, 1845)
 Pseudonebularia wareni (Poppe, Tagaro & R. Salisbury, 2009)
 Pseudonebularia willani (Poppe, Tagaro & R. Salisbury, 2009)

Synonyms
 Pseudonebularia cuyosae(Poppe, 2008) : synonym of Acromargarita cuyosae (Poppe, 2008)
 Pseudonebularia kilburni (Poppe, Tagaro & R. Salisbury, 2009): synonym of Acromargarita kilburni (Poppe, Tagaro & R. Salisbury, 2009)
 Pseudonebularia oliverai (Poppe, 2008): synonym of Acromargarita oliverai (Poppe, 2008)
 Pseudonebularia yayanae  (S.-I Huang, 2011): synonym of Acromargarita yayanae (S.-I Huang, 2011)

References

 
Mitridae
Gastropod genera